Albert Alexander Cramond (12 December 1881 – 21 June 1954) was a New Zealand cricketer. He played one first-class match for Otago in 1904/05.

Crammond was born at Dunedin in 1881. He worked as a merchant.

References

External links
 

1881 births
1954 deaths
New Zealand cricketers
Otago cricketers
Cricketers from Dunedin